Paul Hoffmann (July 1, 1884 – March 9, 1962) was a German neurophysiologist, chiefly known for describing Hoffmann's sign.

Medical career 
Hoffmann was born in Dorpat, Governorate of Estonia, where his father was professor in Internal Medicine. He went on to study medicine in Universities of Leipzig, Marburg and Berlin from where he received his medical degree in 1909.

In 1911, he was appointed as an assistant to Max von Frey at Würzburg University. He published thirty-two articles prior to the beginning of World War I, and during the war, he worked for several German field hospitals in France and the military hospital at Würzburg.

His early worked mainly focused on nerve action potentials and electrophysiology of nerves. He was a prolific writer and researcher, and has been hailed by some as father of modern German neurophysiology.

In 1917, he was appointed as associate professor at University of Berlin and in 1924 he was made director of the Institute of Physiology at University of Freiburg-im-Breisgau. The university was completely destroyed in an aerial raid in 1944, but Hoffmann later continued his work in a new building, until he retired in 1954.

He received honorary degrees form the Humboldt University of Berlin and the University of Zurich.

Hoffmann's sign 

It was in March and August 1915 just few months before Jules Tinel when Hoffmann published two articles in journal Medizinische Klinic describing a method of evaluating success of nerve sutures and nerve regeneration. The sign termed as (H- sign) Hoffmann's sign was elicited by tapping distal to the site of injured nerve which produced tingling sensation, the sensation was neither permanent nor severe. In October 1915, Jules Tinel described the same phenomenon in French "le signe de fourmillement".

Hoffman did not get enough credit in spite of being the first one to describe this sign because after the end of the war, Tinel's research gained more popularity and in all regions outside Germany where the sign is known as Tinel's sign.

References 

1884 births
1962 deaths
Leipzig University alumni
University of Marburg alumni
German neuroscientists
German physiologists
Neurophysiologists